Taiyi, Tai-yi, or Tai yi may refer to:

Religion and philosophy 
 Taiyi, a Chinese name and concept of God
 Taiyi Shengshui (太一生水), Taoist creation myth written about 300 BC
 Taiyi Taoism, school of Taoism during the Jin dynasty
 Taiyi Zhenren, Daoist deity and folklore character
 Tàiyī Yuánjūn or Doumu, goddess in Chinese religion and Taoism
 Taiyi jinhua zongzhi, Chinese for The Secret of the Golden Flower, Taoist classic on neidan meditation

People and places 

 Tai Yi, ancient Chinese name for Mount Taibai in Shaanxi Province
 Tai-yi, courtesy name for Tang of Shang, first king of the Shang dynasty
 Tai-yi Lin (1926–2003), Chinese-American writer and translator
 Taiyi Mountains or Zhongnan Mountains, branch of the Qin Mountains in Shaanxi Province
 Tai Yi Shan, one historic name for Lantau Island, in Hong Kong
 Tái yī xiàn, Chinese for Provincial Highway 1 (Taiwan), a major north-south highway

Other 

 Taiyi, the International Astronomical Union approved name for the star 8 Draconis
 Taiyi, name for ST-23, an acupuncture point
 Tai Yi Shen Shu, a Chinese metaphysical predictive art